The Engie Open Andrézieux-Bouthéon 42 is a tournament for professional female tennis players, played on indoor hard courts. The event is classified as a $60,000 ITF Women's Circuit tournament and has been held annually in Andrézieux-Bouthéon, France, since 2011.

Past finals

Singles

Doubles

External links 
  
 ITF search

ITF Women's World Tennis Tour
Hard court tennis tournaments
Tennis tournaments in France
Recurring sporting events established in 2011